Budan may refer to:
Budan, Iran
Baba Budan, 17th century Sufi reputed to have introduced coffee to India
François Budan de Boislaurent, French mathematician
Igor Budan, Croatian footballer
The Pinyin transliteration of the country Bhutan